Datuk Shalin Zulkifli (born 28 March 1978 in Islington, London, England) is a Malaysian professional ten pin bowler. She has played and won various national and international tournaments, and has at various points in her career ranked No. 1 of the professional ten pin bowlers in Malaysia and Asia.

Bowling career
During 2001 World Tenpin Masters event, she became the first female champion of this event, defeating Finland's Tore Torgersen in the finals. In 2004, she was inducted into International Bowling Hall of Fame.  Bowling in the USA, she was a quarterfinalist at the 2008 US Women's Open, and competed in the 2008-09 PBA Women's Series. In Southeast Asian Games, she is the most successful bowling athlete with 20 gold medals record.

Shalin was born in North Islington and spent her childhood in Kuala Lumpur, Malaysia. She began bowling at the age of 9 and joined the national bowling team in the late 1980s. In 1991 she was named Selangor’s Most Promising Sportsgirl of the Year, and in 1994 became the youngest player and first Malaysian to win the Ladies Open of the Kent Malaysian All-Stars. In 1997 she became the first woman to bowl a 300 in the QubicaAMF Bowling World Cup.

Shalin holds a degree in Sports Science that specialises in Sports Psychology and Coaching. She currently owns and runs a Tenpin Bowling Alley at The Curve, a shopping mall located in Mutiara Damansara.

Shalin has retired from the national team, ended her 28-year-long international bowling career.

Accolades
 Malaysian Sportswoman Award (1997, 1996, 1994, 2001 & 2002)
 Malaysian National Champion (1996, 2001, 2002 & 2003)
 Malaysian Olympian Award (1994 & 1999)
 Asian No. 1 Rank (2000, 2001, 2002 & 2004)
 International Bowler of the Year (2002)
 International Bowling Hall of Fame Inductee (2004)
 Kent Malaysian All-Stars - Ladies Open Champion

1993

 Gold medal, women trio, SEA Games, Singapore
 Gold medal, women team, SEA Games, Singapore
 Silver medal, women double, SEA Games, Singapore
 Silver medal, women master, SEA Games, Singapore

1994

 Gold medal, women trio, Asian Games, Hiroshima, Japan
 Gold medal, women all event, Asian Games, Hiroshima, Japan

1995

 Silver women trio, SEA Games, Chiang Mai, Thailand
 Silver women team, SEA Games, Chiang Mai, Thailand

1996

 2nd World Tenpin Team Cup (Calgary, Canada) - Bronze Medal Champion & Voted MVP
 AMF World Cup (Northern Ireland) - 2nd Position
 Bronze medal -girl double -World Youth Championship

1997

 Gold medal, women double, SEA Games, Jakarta
 Gold medal, women trio, SEA Games, Jakarta 
 Bronze, women team, SEA Games, Jakarta
 Silver, women all event, SEA Games, Jakarta
 Silver, women master, SEA Games, Jakarta

1998

 AMF World Cup (Kobe, Japan) - Record for qualifying for 3 consecutive step ladder final; overall 3rd Position
 Silver medal, women double, Commonwealth Games, Kuala Lumpur
 Gold medal, girl single, World Youth Championship, Incheon, Korea
 Bronze medal, girl double, World Youth Championship, Incheon, Korea
 Bronze medal, girl team, World Youth Championship, Incheon, Korea
 Gold medal, girl all event, World Youth Championship, Incheon, Korea

1999

 Asian Youth (Spore)
 Doubles Gold Medal Champion
 Team Gold Medal Champion
 South East Asian Games (Brunei)
 Doubles Gold Medal Champion
 Trios Gold Medal Champion
 Team Gold Medal Champion
 All-Events Gold Medal Champion
 Masters Gold Medal Champion
 Singles Bronze Medal Champion

2000

 Silver, girl all event, World Youth Championship, Dominican Republic
 Silver, women double, Asian Championship, Doha, Qatar
 Bronze, women team, Asian Championship, Doha, Qatar
 Bronze, women all event, Asian Championship, Doha, Qatar
 Top 8, AMF World Cup, Lisbon, Spain
 1st runner up, Thailand International Open

2001

 World Tenpin Masters (Essex, England) - Became the first female champion of this event, defeating Finland's Tore Torgersen in the finals
 South East Asian Games (Malaysia)
 Singles Gold Medal Champion
 All-Events Gold Medal Champion
 Trios Gold Medal Champion
 Team Gold Medal Champion
 Set 8 Sea Games Records
 Kota Kinabalu Open - Singles Champion

2002

 Thailand International Open - Women's Open Masters Champion
 Philippines International Open - Women Champion
 Pre-Asian Games Storm Cup Korea Open Masters - Women Champion 
 Bronze medal women trio, Asian Games, Busan
 Gold medal women master, Asian Games, Busan, Korea

2003

 World Tenpin Team Cup - Women's Team Gold Medal Champion
 World Tenpin Bowling Championship - Women's Team of Five Gold Medal Champion
 Santa Claus Open - 2nd Position
 Asian Bowling Tour Grand Slam - Women Champion
 Beating the men’s champion Purvis Granger of the Philippines 226-225 to win the ESPN Champion’s Challenge trophy. 
 Asian Bowling Tour Malaysia (Philippines Leg) - Women Champion

2004

 Bahrain Open - Ladies Open Champion
 Sinai Open - Women Champion
 ABF Tour (Thailand Leg) - Women Champion
 Malaysian International Open - Women Champion

2005

 2nd Commonwealth Bowling Championship (Cyprus)
 Masters Gold Medal Champion
 Mix Doubles Gold Medal Champion
 Team Gold Medal Champion
 Singles Bronze Medal Champion
 Malaysian National Championship - Ladies Open Champion (4th consecutive win & 5th in career)

2006

 Silver medal women trio Asian Games 2006, Doha, Qatar
 Gold medal women team Asian Games 2006, Doha, Qatar

2007

 Bronze medal women single South East Asia Games, Thailand
 Bronze medal women double South East Asia Games, Thailand
 Gold medal women trio South East Asia Games, Thailand
 Gold medal women team South East Asia Games, Thailand
 Gold medal mixed double, South East Asia Games, Thailand
 Gold medal women team, World Women Championship, Mexico

2008

 Gold medal women double, Asian Championship, Hong Kong
 Silver medal women team, Asian Championship, Hong Kong

2009

 3rd Singapore International Open
 Women Champion 2nd Ancol Open Bowling Championship, Jakarta, Indonesia

2010
 
 Bronze medal women team Asian Games, Korea
 4th place,  12th Sinai International Open Bowling Championship
 Women Open Champion, Hong Kong International Open
  
2012
 
 2nd, Women Division, Indonesia International Open
 2nd, Women Division, Kuala Lumpur International Open

2013
  
 2nd, Women Division, Singapore International Open
 Bronze medal team event, World Championship, Las Vegas, Nevada, USA

2014
  
 Silver women double, Asian Games, Korea

2015
  
 6th, 41st MWA Singha Thailand International Open  
 Gold, women team SEA Games, Singapore
 Bronze, women double, SEA Games, Singapore

2016
 
 Bronze, women trio, Asian Championship, Hong Kong
 Silver, women team, Asian Championship, Hong Kong
 2nd, Women Open, Indonesia International Open, Jakarta

2017

 Bronze, women single, SEA Games 2017, Kuala Lumpur
 Silver, mixed double, SEA Games 2017, Kuala Lumpur
  Gold, Women Trio, SEA Games 2017, Kuala Lumpur
  Gold, Women Team, SEA Games 2017, Kuala Lumpur
  Gold, women master, SEA Games 2017, Kuala Lumpur
 Gold, women team, World Championship, Las Vegas
 Silver, women double, World Championship, Las Vegas

2018

 Silver, women team, Asian Games, Palembang, Indonesia

2019

 Silver, women team, SEA Games, Manila, Philippines

Honours

Honours of Malaysia
  :
  Member of the Order of the Defender of the Realm (AMN) (1995)
  Officer of the Order of the Defender of the Realm (KMN) (2001)
  Companion of the Order of Loyalty to the Crown of Malaysia (JSM) (2021)
  :
  Knight Commander of the Order of the Territorial Crown (PMW) – Datuk (2023)

References

External links
 Profile at Malaysian Tenpin Bowling Congress
 2006 Asian Games article on the Malaysian bowling team
 Shalin Zulkifli's List of Awards at Storm International
 2005 World Games Article
 2005 Commonwealth Tenpin Bowling Championship roster
 Article on the 2006 Asian Games
 28th Thailand International Open

1978 births
Living people
Malaysian people of Malay descent
Malaysian ten-pin bowling players
People from Islington (district)
English people of Malaysian descent
English people of Malay descent
Asian Games medalists in bowling
Bowlers at the 1994 Asian Games
Bowlers at the 1998 Asian Games
Bowlers at the 2002 Asian Games
Bowlers at the 2006 Asian Games
Bowlers at the 2010 Asian Games
Bowlers at the 2014 Asian Games
Bowlers at the 2018 Asian Games
Asian Games gold medalists for Malaysia
Asian Games silver medalists for Malaysia
Asian Games bronze medalists for Malaysia
Medalists at the 2002 Asian Games
Medalists at the 2006 Asian Games
Medalists at the 2010 Asian Games
Medalists at the 2014 Asian Games
Medalists at the 2018 Asian Games
British emigrants to Malaysia
Citizens of Malaysia through descent
Southeast Asian Games gold medalists for Malaysia
Southeast Asian Games bronze medalists for Malaysia
Southeast Asian Games silver medalists for Malaysia
Southeast Asian Games medalists in bowling
Companions of the Order of Loyalty to the Crown of Malaysia
Officers of the Order of the Defender of the Realm
Members of the Order of the Defender of the Realm
Competitors at the 1999 Southeast Asian Games
Competitors at the 2001 Southeast Asian Games
Competitors at the 2019 Southeast Asian Games
Competitors at the 2001 World Games
Competitors at the 2005 World Games
World Games silver medalists
World Games medalists in bowling